Vittoria Candida Rosa Caldoni (6 March 1805 in Albano Laziale – 1872?/1890? in Russia) was an Italian artists' model. She was the most popular model among the German artists residing in Rome in the early nineteenth-century; especially those associated with the Nazarene movement. Over 100 paintings with her image have survived.

Life 
She was the sixth of nine children born to a winemaking family, and one of five that survived to adulthood. At the age of fifteen, she was "discovered" by August Kestner and was brought to Rome to work as a  model. This proved to be very profitable for her family, enabling them to move into larger quarters and begin renting rooms to travelers; mostly artists.

One of their tenants was an aspiring Ukrainian painter named Grigory Ignatevich Lapchenko. She married him in 1839 and emigrated to Russia, where they apparently had at least one son. 
Grigory became seriously ill with an unspecified condition that affected his eyesight, so he had to give up his plans to become a painter and worked as a minor government official.

Her life in Russia was not well documented (which was common there at that time), so no reliable information exists regarding her date and place of death. It is assumed that her life there was mundane and financially difficult.

Work as a model
Many artists considered her to be an ideal female figure. She was generally portrayed in local costume or allegorical garb, often with attributes that referred to representations of the Madonna. 

The exact number of paintings she sat for is unknown and many were destroyed, especially during World War II. There are also a few portrait busts. Complicating matters is the fact that many images of her were not done from life. A portrait of her by Pablo Picasso is an obvious example of this.

Among the artists who are known to have engaged her services as a model, one may mention:

 Ernst von Bandel
 Carl Joseph Begas
 Carl Blechen
 Franz Ludwig Catel
 Peter von Cornelius
 Marie Ellenrieder
 Joseph von Führich
 August Grahl
 Wilhelm Hensel
 Heinrich Maria von Hess
 Peter von Hess
 Franz Horny
 Woldemar Hottenroth
 Auguste Hüssener
 Alexander Andreyevich Ivanov
 Paul Emil Jacobs
 Wilhelm von Kaulbach
 August Kestner
 Eduard Magnus
 Friedrich Mosbrugger
 Michael Neher
 Theobald von Oer
 Carl Oesterley
 Moritz Oppenheim
 Friedrich Overbeck
 Friedrich Preller the Elder
 Johann Anton Ramboux
 Theodor Rehbenitz
 August Riedel
 Johann Scheffer von Leonhardshoff
 Julius Schnorr von Carolsfeld
 Julius Schoppe
 Joseph Anton Settegast
 Erwin Speckter
 Franz Seraph Stirnbrand
 Franz Xaver Stöber
 Pietro Tenerani 
 Bertel Thorvaldsen
 Horace Vernet
 Carl Christian Vogel von Vogelstein
 Karl Wilhelm Wach
 Friedrich Wasmann
 Theodor Leopold Weller
 Franz Xaver Winterhalter

References

Further reading and sources
 Rita Giuliani: Vittoria Caldoni Lapčenko. La «fanciulla di Albano» nell'arte, nell'estetica e nella letteratura russa (The "Girl of Albano" in Art, Aesthetics and Russian Literature), Gangemi (2013) 
Amrei I. Gold: Der Modellkult um Sarah Siddons, Emma Hamilton, Vittoria Caldoni und Jane Morris - Ikonographische Analyse und Werkkatalog. Dissertation. University of Münster (2009).
Ulrike Koeltz: Vittoria Caldoni – Modell und Identifikationsfigur des 19 Jahrhunderts, in the "Europäische Hochschulschriften Reihe XXVIII – Kunstgeschichte". Vol.436. Frankfurt (2010).

External links 

 Rome Today/Castelli Today: "Festa della donna: Albano dedica una strada a Vittoria Caldoni" (Albano names a street after Vittoria Caldoni) 8 March 2013.

1805 births
Year of death unknown
People from Albano Laziale
German artists' models
Nazarene movement
Italian artists' models
Italian emigrants to the Russian Empire
Place of death unknown